María Asunción Aramburuzabala Larregui (born 2 May 1963) is a Mexican billionaire businesswoman. She is the chairperson of Tresalia Capital, a venture capital firm. As of March 2022, her net worth is estimated at US$6.2 billion.

Early life
María Asunción Aramburuzabala Larregui was born on 2 May 1963 in Mexico City, Mexico to Pablo Aramburuzabala Ocaranza, a Spanish Basque brewer in Mexico, and Lucrecia Larregui González, a Mexican painter whose father, José Larregui Iriarte, was a Navarrese miller in Mexico. She is the granddaughter of Félix Aramburuzabala Lazcano-Iturburu, a Spanish Basque immigrant who co-founded the Mexican brewery Grupo Modelo in 1925 with his friend and partner Pablo Díez Fernández. Her father was the Executive Vice President of the Grupo Modelo brewery.

Aramburuzabala graduated from the Instituto Tecnológico Autónomo de México where she majored in accounting.

Family business
The Mexican brewery, Cervecería Modelo, was founded in 1925 by a group of businessmen, including don Pablo Díez Fernández — who became the company's President, CEO and major stockholder — and Felix Aramburuzabala. Felix's son, Pablo Aramburuzabala, the executive vice president of the brewery, died unexpectedly in 1995 of lung cancer at the age of 63.  After his death, several groups tried to gain control of his family's share in Modelo — his wife and two daughters bonded together against these groups. 

The family created Tresalia Capital ("tres aliadas" or three allies) in order to diversify the family investments.  Through Tresalia, they have made investments in large Mexican companies, as well as the management of private equity, real estate, infrastructure, venture capital, technology and the creation of new companies.

After Grupo Modelo's sale, she reinvested her proceeds into Anheuser-Busch InBev, continuing the family tradition in the beer business.

Wealth
With a net worth estimated at $6.2 billion, she is the sixth-richest person and second-richest woman in Mexico.

In October 2021, she was found to be implicated in the Pandora Papers, which uncovered the offshore hidden wealth of many around the world, in a similar manner as the Panama Papers. According to the Pandora Papers, Aramburuzabala acquired two private jets and transferred at least $40 million through a trust fund located in New Zealand, Sky Chariot Trust.

Personal life
In 1982, she married Paulo Patricio Zapata Navarro. They had two children, and they divorced in 1997.

On 26 February 2005, she married Tony Garza, U.S. ambassador to Mexico, in a small religious ceremony in Mexico City. On 23 April, they had the civil ceremony near Valle de Bravo, west of Mexico City. U.S. First Lady Laura Bush attended. An estimated one-third of the guests were from Texas. The couple divorced in May 2010.

Awards and honors
First woman to be inducted into the prestigious IAOP (International Association of Outsourcing Providers)
2004, Golden Plate Award of the American Academy of Achievement, presented by Awards Council member Carlos Slim
2007, Fortune Magazine’s “50 most powerful women in global business”
2009, San Antonio Woman of Achievement
2014, Named One of Mexico’s Most Powerful Women by Forbes

References

External links

1963 births
Living people
Instituto Tecnológico Autónomo de México alumni
Mexican billionaires
Female billionaires
20th-century Mexican businesswomen
20th-century Mexican businesspeople
Mexican people of Basque descent
Mexican brewers
Businesspeople from Mexico City
Mexican emigrants to the United States
Spouses of Texas politicians
People named in the Pandora Papers
21st-century Mexican businesswomen
21st-century Mexican businesspeople